Michael Edward Ulicny (September 28, 1917 – September 22, 2005), nicknamed "Slugs", was an American professional baseball catcher. He played in Major League Baseball (MLB) for the Boston Braves in 1945.

Biography
Ulicny's professional baseball career spanned 1938 to 1950; he appeared in a total of 886 minor league games. He is one of many ballplayers who only appeared in the major leagues during World War II. He hit well in the 11 games he played for the Boston Braves, going 7-for-18, a .389 batting average. He had one home run, four runs batted in (RBIs), four runs scored, and a .611 slugging percentage. He was mainly used as a pinch-hitter, appearing in only four games as a catcher. His uncommon last name sometimes appeared in newspaper box scores of the era as "Ulisney". In 1950, he served as player-manager of the minor league Niagara Falls Citizens.

Ulicny served in the United States Army during World War II, including in 1943 when he was stationed at Fort Dix (New Jersey) and Camp Gordon Johnston (Florida) and did not play baseball professionally. He died at the age of 87 in New Smyrna Beach, Florida. He is buried at Deltona Memorial Gardens in Orange City, Florida.

References

External links
 
 

Major League Baseball catchers
Baseball players from Pennsylvania
United States Army personnel of World War II
Boston Braves players
Fulton Eagles players
Thomasville Orioles players
Trenton Packers players
Montreal Royals players
New Orleans Pelicans (baseball) players
Milwaukee Brewers (minor league) players
Atlanta Crackers players
Chattanooga Lookouts players
Fort Lauderdale Braves players
Niagara Falls Citizens players
Minor league baseball managers
1917 births
2005 deaths